The peso moneda nacional (symbol: m$n) was the currency of Argentina from 5 November 1881 to 1 January 1970, the date in which the peso ley 18.188 was issued to the Argentine public. It was subdivided into 100 centavos, with the argentino worth 5 pesos. The peso was introduced to replace the Argentine peso moneda corriente at a rate of  25 = m$n 1.

History
The peso moneda nacional replaced the Argentine real at a rate of one to eight. It also replaced the peso fuerte at par and the peso moneda corriente at a rate of 25 pesos moneda corriente = 1 peso moneda nacional. The peso moneda nacional was itself replaced by the peso ley at a rate of one hundred to one.

The peso was initially pegged to the French franc at a rate of 1 peso = 5 francs. In 1883, when silver coins ceased production, the paper peso was set at a value of 2.2 francs or 638.7 mg gold. After a suspension in the gold standard from 1914, in 1927, a peg to the U.S. dollar was established of 2.36 pesos = 1 dollar. The rate changed to 1.71 pesos = 1 dollar in 1931, then to 3 pesos = 1 dollar in 1933. Between 1934 and 1939, the peso was pegged to sterling at a rate of 15 pesos = £1 stg (1 peso = 1s. 4d. stg). High inflation in the post-war period lead to the introduction of the peso ley 18.188 in 1970 at the rate of 100 pesos moneda nacional = 1 peso ley.

Coins
In 1881, silver 10, 20 and 50 centavos and 1 peso and gold 1 argentino coins were introduced, followed by bronze 1 and 2 centavos the next year. Silver coins ceased production in 1883, with gold coins ending in 1896. Base metal 5, 10 and 20 centavos were introduced in 1896, with base 50 centavos following in 1941. The 1 peso was reintroduced in 1957, with 5, 10 and 25 pesos introduced in 1961, 1962 and 1964.

Centavo

Peso

Banknotes

The first nationally issued banknotes were introduced by the Banco Nacional in 1884. These were in denominations of 5, 10, 20 and 50 centavos. In 1891 and 1892, the same denominations were produced by the Banco de la Nación Argentina. In 1894, the Banco de la Nación Argentina introduced larger denomination notes for 1, 2, 5, 10, 20, 50, 100, 200, 500 and 1000 pesos.

Paper money production was taken over by the Caja de Conversion in 1899. That year, 50 centavos, 1 and 100 pesos were introduced, followed in 1900 by notes for 5, 10, 50, 500 and 1000 pesos. These notes were issued until 1935, when the Banco Central began to produce notes.

Issues 1899-1935 
Law 3505, of 20 September 1897, authorized the Caja de Conversión to renovate all paper money in existence at the time. They decided to make new design called "Progress's Effigy" ("Efigie del Progreso").

These bank notes were created originally in a bigger size and printed by the mint (Casa de Moneda), using French-made paper.
Due to their size, and the paper not being of good enough quality, they began to deteriorate. They then decided to suspend the printing and look for another provider. The new notes, of smaller size, started to be issued in 1903, using typography as the printing method.

The Banco Central issued the following banknotes:

References

External links
 Pesos moneda nacional coin photos

1881 establishments in Argentina
Peso moneda nacional
1970 disestablishments in Argentina